Warren Fisher Daniell (June 26, 1826 – July 30, 1913) was an American politician and a U.S. Representative from New Hampshire. He was also a manufacturer, stock breeder, and banker.

Early life
Born in Newton Lower Falls, Massachusetts, Daniell attended the common schools, and moved with his parents to Franklin, New Hampshire, in 1834. He continued his studies until fourteen years of age, when he entered his father's paper mill as an apprentice.

Career
Daniell constructed a paper mill at Waterville, Maine, in 1852, and in the following year managed a similar mill in Pepperell, Massachusetts. He returned to Franklin, New Hampshire, in 1854 and while engaged in the manufacture of paper, he also engaged in agricultural pursuits and the breeding of blooded stock on a large model farm within Franklin's city limits. He was director of the Franklin National Bank and trustee of the Franklin Savings Bank.

Daniell served as member of the New Hampshire House of Representatives in 1861, 1862, and 1870-1877. He served as delegate to the Democratic National Convention in 1872, and in the New Hampshire Senate in 1873 and 1874.

Elected as a Democrat to the Fifty-second Congress, Daniell served as United States Representative for the second district of New Hampshire from (March 4, 1891 – March 3, 1893). He was not a candidate for renomination in 1892. He continued his activities in the manufacture of paper at Franklin, New Hampshire, until 1898, being interested in the Winnepesogee Paper Co.

Death
Daniell died in Franklin, July 30, 1913, and is interred at Franklin Cemetery, Franklin, Merrimack County, New Hampshire.

Family life
Son of Jeremiah Fisher and Sarah Daniell, he married Elizabeth D. Rundlett on December 31, 1850, and they had a son, Harry W. Elizabeth died in 1853, and on October 19, 1860, he married Abbie Ann Sanger and they had four sons, Eugene S., Otis, Warren F., and Jere R.

References

External links

1826 births
1913 deaths
Democratic Party members of the New Hampshire House of Representatives
Democratic Party New Hampshire state senators
Democratic Party members of the United States House of Representatives from New Hampshire
People from Franklin, New Hampshire
19th-century American politicians
People from Newton, Massachusetts